Kung Fu Panda: Secrets of the Masters is a 2011 animated short film from DreamWorks Animation. It was released on December 13, 2011 as a special feature attached to the Kung Fu Panda 2 DVD and Blu-ray. The short consists mostly of a traditional animation (17 minutes), which was created by Duncan Studio. It uncovers the backgrounds of the masters of Gongmen City: Master Thundering Rhino, Master Storming Ox, and Master Croc.

A significant feature has Jack Black, Dustin Hoffman, Angelina Jolie, Seth Rogen, Randall Duk Kim, and Dennis Haysbert reprising their roles from the movies. Although, Jean-Claude Van Damme and Victor Garber didn't reprise their roles from the sequel.

Synopsis
Under the pretense of an emergency in the dead of night, Master Po (Jack Black) leads Master Tigress (Angelina Jolie) and Master Mantis (Seth Rogen) into breaking into the new Masters' Council exhibit in tribute of Masters Thundering Rhino, Ox, and Croc. Even though Tigress and Mantis are annoyed at the deception, Po engages their interest in the story of how the trio of masters first met.

Long ago in the city of Jinzhou, where Kung Fu was practiced for the sport of street fighting, Rhino (Paul Scheer), Ox (Dennis Haysbert) and Croc (Tony Leondis) were small-time pit fighters who attracted the attention of Grand Master Oogway (Randall Duk Kim), who, seeing their talent and focus, wished them to find something worthy to fight for. As the trio fought themselves to a standstill, two of the villainous Wu Sisters were freeing their leader and eldest sister Su Wu (Sumalee Montano). To recapture them, Oogway persuades Rhino, Ox and Croc into helping him find the sisters at Hubei Volcano. However, to his disappointment, Oogway has to appeal to them with vague prospects of being put on a path to riches to get that cooperation.

While the Wu Sisters plot to unite the various criminal gangs to seize control of China, Master Oogway has to brush off each of his compatriot's petty proposals during the journey to abandon the others for their benefit. At camp, Oogway eventually discovers that while Croc and Ox are motivated by narcissism and greed respectively, Rhino has a deep-seated need to win his dad Master Flying Rhino's respect. To that, Oogway suggests to all of them that their current goals will only keep them wanting more, and "changing course" can lead to better lives for all. Before the trio can comprehend Oogway's point, a messenger bird from the Sisters arrives to reveal their plan and Oogway has the company set off immediately.

To encourage them to change their ways, Master Oogway secretly leads the trio into an extremely dangerous path across the Bridge of Mists and forces them to cooperate in order for them all to safely pass to illustrate his point of selflessness. However, when the trio finally learn that Oogway was being metaphorical about his promise of riches actually meaning "emotional riches", their protests accidentally get them trapped on a river of lava. Oogway manages to get them to safe ground, but he falls over a lava fall, leaving them with only the advice "Remember the path" to guide them now.

Dispirited at their loss, the trio try to find their way home. However, they encounter a rabbit village devastated by the Wu Sisters and its citizens' desperately try to hire them for protection. Moved by the villagers' plight, the trio decline the fee and resolve to stop the Wu Sisters for the sake of a higher ideal.

Thus motivated, the trio interrupt the Sister's summit. When the former street fighters reveal that they're doing this purely for honor, they intimidate the various visiting gangs into retreating while the Wu Sisters fight alone. Even though the Wu Sisters prove too much to fight individually, Rhino, Ox and Croc manage to combine their talents to defeat them in a coordinated attack. At the moment of their victory, Master Oogway (who somehow survived) reappears, having captured the rest of the gangs and praising his fellows for being worthy warriors who have found a higher purpose.

The scene returns to the exhibit in the morning, where Master Po concludes the story of how the new masters formed the Masters' Council in Gongmen City. Unfortunately, Master Shifu (Dustin Hoffman) discovers them, Po initially thinking he is an exhibit. While not being furious, he still sets Po to work to repair the roof he damaged breaking in before the exhibit opens in 20 minutes (using a trowel that Po thinks is a legendary weapon). Unfortunately, Po manages to accidentally lock himself in a sarcophagus that once served as Su Wu's prison cell and is trapped, so he decides to take a power nap instead, leaving the roof unfixed.

Voice cast

 Jack Black as Po
 Angelina Jolie as Tigress
 Dustin Hoffman as Shifu
 Randall Duk Kim as Oogway
 Seth Rogen as Mantis
 Todd Berger as Pig Server
 David Cowgill as Flying Rhino
 Donald Fullilove as Gorilla Guard #1
 Dennis Haysbert as Young Storming Ox
 Joseph Izzo as Little Birdie
 Tony Leondis as Young Croc
 Edie Mirman as Mother Bunny
 Sumalee Montano as Su Wu / Wing Wu / Wan Wu
 Michelle Ruff as Money Bunny
 Paul Scheer as Young Thundering Rhino
 Paul Vogt as Pig Announcer

Awards
Secrets of the Masters won in 2012 an Annie Award for Best Animated Special Production.

References

External links

 Kung Fu Panda: Secrets of the Masters at Internet Movie Database

2011 short films
2011 animated films
2011 films
2010s American animated films
2010s animated short films
American animated short films
Animated films about animals
Kung Fu Panda films
Wuxia films
Films directed by Tony Leondis
Films with screenplays by Todd Berger
DreamWorks Animation animated short films
2010s English-language films